The electoral district of Nash was a Legislative Assembly electorate in the state of Queensland, Australia. It was named after James Nash, the discoverer of gold in the area.

History
Nash was created in the 1949 redistribution, taking effect at the 1950 state election, and existed until the 1960 state election. It centred on the town of Gympie.

When Nash was abolished in 1960, its area was incorporated into the recreated district of Gympie.

Members

The following people were elected in the seat of Nash:

Dunstan previously represented Gympie (1935–1950).
Hodges subsequently represented Gympie (1960–1979).

Election results

References

Former electoral districts of Queensland
1950 establishments in Australia
1960 disestablishments in Australia
Constituencies established in 1950
Constituencies disestablished in 1960